"crazytimesh*tshow" is the fifth episode of the third season of the American dark comedy crime television series Barry. It is the 21st overall episode of the series and was written by supervising producer Emily Heller, and directed by series co-creator Alec Berg. It was first broadcast on HBO in the United States on May 22, 2022, and also was available on HBO Max on the same date.

The series follows Barry Berkman, a hitman from Cleveland who travels to Los Angeles to kill someone but finds himself joining an acting class taught by Gene Cousineau, where he meets aspiring actress Sally Reed and begins to question his path in life as he deals with his criminal associates such as Monroe Fuches and NoHo Hank. In the episode, Barry attempts to reconnect with Sally by being more sincere. Meanwhile, Cristobal's wife arrives at Los Angeles, while Gene attends a party hosted by Joe Mantegna.

According to Nielsen Media Research, the episode was seen by an estimated 0.257 million household viewers and gained a 0.04 ratings share among adults aged 18–49. The episode received extremely positive reviews from critics, with critics praising the performances, humor and character development, although some expressed criticism for the pace.

Plot
A brief flashback depicts Barry (Bill Hader) trying to save his partner, Albert Nguyen (James Hiroyuki Liao), when he is shot at Korengal Valley. In present day, Albert is revealed to be alive and working as an FBI special agent; he visits Mae Dunn (Sarah Burns) and Chief Krauss (Gary Kraus), intending to find Janice Moss' murderer. He rejects the idea that "The Raven" killed her, and wonders about Barry's role in her death.

Barry moves back with his old roommates, but his old room is extremely limited as they turned it into an audition room. Barry also asks relationship advice from Hank (Anthony Carrigan) and Cristobal (Michael Irby), who both state that Barry needs to express himself more sincerely to Sally. Joplin initially becomes a viewership success at its streaming service, BanShe, but the show is soon overshadowed by a new show, frustrating Sally (Sarah Goldberg). When she complains to BanShe executives, they announce they will cancel the show, despite its glowing reviews and only being online for barely 12 hours, citing that their algorithm indicated it wouldn't reach its target demographic. Natalie (D'Arcy Carden) consoles Sally, stating that she created something special and that she learned a lot working with her.

Albert is dismayed at the police's incompetence and demands that they interrogate more suspects. Fernando's daughter and Cristobal's wife, Elena (Krizia Bajos), arrives at Los Angeles, intending to find the people responsible for her father's death. She leads a raid on the heroin shop, killing some of Hank's employees, at the same time the police arrive. Batir (JB Blanc) evades the raid as he live-streams the operations to his Chechen bosses, who are angry with the attack. Hank is alerted of the attack by Akhmal (Turhan Troy Caylak), who was kidnapped by the Bolivians. He hides in a closet just as the Bolivians enter and take Cristobal. Elena wanders through the house and is heartbroken to see a picture of Hank and Cristobal together and she leaves.

With his new success, Gene (Henry Winkler) attends a party hosted by Joe Mantegna. At dinner, Gene apologizes for his poor behavior in the past to Mantegna, and also apologizes to a woman whom he previously dated, Annie (Laura San Giacomo). Annie then states that Gene ruined her directing career by blacklisting her from the industry after she left him. She then leaves the party, unwilling to accept his apology. Meanwhile, Fuches (Stephen Root) starts recruiting hitmen by contacting the sister of Barry's fellow hitman Taylor, claiming Barry owed him money.

At his house, Barry runs into Kyle (Alexander Macnicoll) as he was checking it and just asks him to help him open the door for the grocery bag. Kyle runs back to his car, where Julie (Annabeth Gish) states she will be the one that kills Barry. That night at Sally's house, Barry leaves a note to Sally and to return his key when Sally enters, crying from the show's cancellation. Despite wanting to be alone, Barry consoles her and asks for the executive's address, claiming he will "freak" her out and detailing some planned psychological torture. An even more scared Sally demands that he leave. Outside, Julie and Kyle prepare to execute their plan when Julie accidentally pulls the trigger and shoots Kyle in the stomach, alerting Barry. Julie then drives off while Barry stares at the van, before walking away.

Production

Development
In April 2022, the episode's title was revealed as "crazytimesh*tshow" and it was announced that supervising producer Emily Heller had written the episode while series co-creator Alec Berg had directed it. This was Heller's third writing credit, and Berg's seventh directing credit.

Writing
Part of Sally's storyline was inspired by a friend of Bill Hader, who worked on a Netflix series. The friend claimed to have a show on the homepage in the early morning, but once Hader searched for it overnight, he found it missing. He further added, "it was like that joke that's in there where she had to type out pretty much the whole thing before it showed up. That is from life." The idea was also suggested by Amy Gravitt, HBO’s EVP of Original Programming, who suggested that Sally could get everything right and then her series gets cancelled.  Originally, after Joplins cancellation, Natalie would say "I'm so sorry" to the writers room while she starts taking stuff from the office. While Hader and the crew laughed with the scene, he felt that the scene "undermined the emotion of it completely" and replaced it with the bathroom scene.

Barry's role in the episode was much smaller in the original episode. The character would appear in very few scenes before the final scene with Sally. Hader felt that Barry had "no real story" on the episode and decided to add more scenes with his roommates, the grocery bags and asking advice from Hank and Cristobal. Barry's collage was inspired by the 1981 film Thief, where Frank (portrayed by James Caan) took out a collage he made, a scene that Hader found hilarious, "We thought that was really funny that this tough guy had made a collage like our sisters would make." As a nod to Thief, the picture of Willie Nelson on Barry's collage is the same as the picture on Thief.

The raid at the heroin shop was inspired by Mad Max 2, where Max Rockatansky witnesses the raid at the compound. For the series, Batir witnesses the raid while live-streaming with his Chechen bosses. The title of the episode derives from one of the bosses commenting on the livestream “Batir, this is [a] crazy time shitshow” as the Chechens, Bolivians, and police fight over the heroin shop. Elena's arrival at Hank's and Cristobal's house was reshot, as the writers felt her surprise arrival would only cause confusion.

Reception

Viewers
The episode was watched by 0.257 million viewers, earning a 0.04 in the 18-49 rating demographics on the Nielson ratings scale. This means that 0.04 percent of all households with televisions watched the episode. This was a slight decrease from the previous episode, which was watched by 0.270 million viewers with a 0.05 in the 18-49 demographics.

Critical reviews
"crazytimesh*tshow" received largely positive reviews from critics. David Cote of The A.V. Club gave the episode an "A-" and wrote, "Either way, it felt like a small misstep in a show that is trying something exceedingly difficult: an elaborate comic conceit wrapped in a tragic vision. Barrys moral compass turns on two interrelated dichotomies: forgiveness vs. vengeance, and happiness vs. success. No character can have it all. The cycles of chasing either showbiz success or retribution feed each other, ensuring sorrow for anyone who stays in the game. Barry will only know peace if he gives himself up to the police or dies. That could make Albert the angel of death."

Ben Rosenstock of Vulture gave the episode a 3 star rating out of 5 and wrote, "'Crazytimesh*tshow' is a solid but slightly disjointed episode of Barry with much left unresolved. It's hard to know exactly what to make of Sally's story, for example. [...] As we barrel toward season three's endgame, there are a lot of balls in the air — and 'Crazytimesh*tshow' only adds to the juggling act. It makes for a slightly unwieldy but thrilling episode. I've never wanted to watch the next one more." Nick Harley of Den of Geek gave the episode a perfect 5 star rating out of 5 and wrote, "As I said up top, this episode is jam-packed and it's pretty successful with everything it presents, but it still leaves you wishing there was more time spent exploring Gene's mental state and where his feelings with Barry lie, or Barry trying to work through what exactly went wrong with Sally. A little more emphasis on character moments could take this already excellent show to the next level, but this is the tiniest of nit-picks."

Notes

References

External links
 "crazytimesh*tshow" at HBO
 

Barry (TV series) episodes
2022 American television episodes